Kevin Granger (born December 30, 1973) is a retired American expatriate professional basketball player who is best known for leading NCAA Division I in scoring with a 27.0 points per game average in 1995–96.

Granger grew up in Scooba, Mississippi and attended Kemper County High School (KCHS). He earned First Team All-District, First Team All-State and All-America honors after leading KCHS to the 3-A State Championship. Granger then attended Texas Southern University and became a four-year starter on the varsity basketball team while playing the point guard position. By the time he graduated in 1996 he had established himself as one of the school's all-time leaders in points, assists (467) and steals (146). Granger was named the Southwestern Athletic Conference Freshman of the Year, 1994 SWAC Tournament MVP, and was a two-time First Team All-SWAC and Black College All-American selection.

He did not get selected in the 1996 NBA Draft so Granger took his game overseas. In three professional seasons, he played in Cyprus, Argentina (Regatas Corrientes) and Italy (Floor Padova). Upon returning to the United States, Granger became a high school basketball coach and special education teacher at Worthing High School in Houston, Texas. He left the school to become an assistant coach at his alma mater with the promise of becoming the new head coach once interim coach Robert Moreland resigned. Granger and TSU had entered a gentleman's agreement, but once TSU's old athletic director was fired by the school president, he was never given the opportunity to become the head coach and filed a lawsuit in response. Granger married his college sweetheart, Tracy, who was also a Texas Southern cheerleader, and they have four children together.

See also
List of NCAA Division I men's basketball season scoring leaders

References

1973 births
Living people
American men's basketball players
American expatriate basketball people in Argentina
American expatriate basketball people in Cyprus
American expatriate basketball people in Italy
Basketball coaches from Mississippi
Basketball players from Mississippi
High school basketball coaches in the United States
People from Kemper County, Mississippi
Point guards
Regatas Corrientes basketball players
Texas Southern Tigers athletic directors
Texas Southern Tigers men's basketball coaches
Texas Southern Tigers men's basketball players